"Pointless" is a song by Scottish singer-songwriter Lewis Capaldi. It was released on 2 December 2022 as the second single from his upcoming second studio album, Broken by Desire to Be Heavenly Sent (2023). "Pointless" reached number-one in the UK Singles Chart on 13 January 2023, becoming Capaldi's fourth number-one single in the United Kingdom.

Background
"Pointless" was written by Capaldi, Johnny McDaid, Steve Mac and Ed Sheeran. Capaldi posted previews of the song in November 2022. In an interview with The Big Issue, he explained that the track is about "being in love" and that he hopes to have it played at weddings. The song originally stems from an unfinished track that Mac, McDaid and Sheeran had been working on. After hearing it, Capaldi "tweaked it a little bit" and put his "stamp" on it, writing the chorus and the middle eight.

Music video
The music video was directed by Hector Dockrill. It tells the story of a single mother, played by Irish actress Niamh Algar, raising her son, played by British actor George Jaques.

Charts

Certifications

References

2022 singles
2022 songs
Lewis Capaldi songs
Songs written by Lewis Capaldi
Songs written by Ed Sheeran
Songs written by Johnny McDaid
Songs written by Steve Mac
UK Singles Chart number-one singles
Pop ballads